The McGill Law Journal is a student-run legal publication at McGill University Faculty of Law in Montreal. It is a not-for-profit corporation independent of the Faculty and it is managed exclusively by students. The Journal also publishes the Canadian Guide to Uniform Legal Citation and a series of podcasts since 2012. 

A 2022 study assessing the most cited Law Review articles in the history of the Supreme Court of Canada found that the McGill Law Journal was one of a select few elite law journals in Canada and the McGill Law Journal was the most cited by the Supreme Court of Canada with 150 citations, with the second and third place consisting of 100 and 86 citations, respectively.

Overview
Since the 1970s, the McGill Law Journal has been cited more often by the Supreme Court of Canada than any other university-affiliated law journal in the world. Journal subscribers reside in more than twenty-five countries.

Following the faculty's policy of bilingualism, the McGill Law Journal is published in both French and English. The editorial team is therefore composed of both French- and English-speaking students who select and edit articles written in both languages. The Journal publishes texts dealing with different topics in civil law, common law, and Indigenous legal traditions. A member of the legal community wishing to have his or her article published in the Journal can make a submission through the McGill Law Journal website.

History 
The McGill Law Journal was founded in 1952 by Gérald Éric Le Dain and Jacques-Yvan Morin, two students at McGill University’s Faculty of Law. The Journal was the third entirely student-run journal to appear in Canada. The first issue was edited by the founding editor in chief, Jacques-Yvan Morin. From its inception, the Journal has promoted the development of legal research, attracting a readership of law professors, lawyers, and students. The goal of its founders was to create a forum for intellectual exchange for Quebec's legal community. Because the province is at the crossroads of the two great private law traditions of the Western world, civil law and common law, the first editors of the Journal immediately recognized its potential as a tool for the development of civil law doctrine in English and in French.

Since it published its first volume in 1952, the McGill Law Journal has built its reputation over the years as a renowned legal source. Today, the Journal is as renowned internationally as it is in Canada. Not only does the Journal produce high-quality publications for jurists and legal professionals, but it also enables its editors to learn and perfect important skills for their legal careers.

Reputation
The McGill Law Review was the first law journal in Canada to be cited by the Supreme Court of Canada and has since been cited by the Supreme Court in 150 cases. 

In 2010, the Faculty of Law at Washington and Lee University gave the McGill Law Journal the award for best student-run legal journal in the world outside the United States.

The Australian Research Council (ARC) ranked the McGill Law Journal among the best English-language law journals in the world giving it an A* rating, giving it a rating shared by only 62 law reviews globally out of 1,265 law journals.

Other Publications and Events

Canadian Guide to Uniform Legal Citation 
The first Canadian Guide to Uniform Legal Citation was published by the editors of the McGill Law Journal in 1986. To date, the Guide is in its ninth edition. With the help of members of the legal community—lawyers, judges, librarians, and professors—the Guide evolves with the legal profession. A new edition of the Guide is published every four years.

The Canadian Guide to Uniform Legal Citation provides guidelines on how to build a bibliography and how to reference sources ranging from statutes and case law to Indigenous treaties and Talmudic law. The Guide is a reference standard for many courts and Canadian legal journals. The Guide can be purchased online through the McGill Law Journal website.

Podcasts 
In 2012, the McGill Law Journal started publishing a series of podcasts exploring different aspects of Canadian law, the first Canadian law journal to do so. In the podcast, leading academics, practicing lawyers, or other member of the legal community shed light on contemporary legal issues in conversation with members of the McGill Law Journal.

Recent episodes published by the Journal cover topics such as the legal aspects of climate change, the debate over the notwithstanding clause in Quebec's Act Respecting the Laicity of the State, and the use of artificial intelligence in the legal field. By examining the legal dimensions of contentious issues, the podcast aims to share legal knowledge and expertise with members of the legal community and of the public.

Special Issues 
Special issues of the McGill Law Journal, which are published about once per volume, are the Journal’s way of sharing legal information on a specific issue to a wider audience. Once a topic is chosen, the Journal invites internationally renowned specialists to write about it. Topics ranging from international human rights, contemporary Canadian constitutional law, and reform of the Russian Civil Code have all been selected for special issues. Other topics have included international dispute resolution, the legacy of Roncarelli v. Duplessis, technological innovations and civil liability, and legal pluralism in Indigenous communities.

For just one example of how impactful these special issues can be, take the issue published by Volume 45 on genetics and the law. The issue was noticed by the Canadian National Judicial Institute and was used at a conference in June 2000. Copies were distributed to and read by more than fifty Canadian and American judges.

Events organized by the McGill Law Journal 
The McGill Law Journal organizes several events throughout the year attended by the McGill community and members of the public. These events are designed to promote student involvement and academic research while allowing the Journal to attract high-quality submissions from legal scholars. Each year, an English-language conference and a French-language conference are organized to enlighten the general public on a legal issue. Following each conference, the Journal holds a reception that allows members of the legal community to discuss the topic. The conferences help members of different bar associations obtain professional development credits.

The McGill Law Journal’s Annual English Lecture 
Since the early 2000s, the McGill Law Journal has invited a well-known speakers to give a presentation to the McGill legal community and other people residing in Montreal. The lecture is then published in the Journal. The annual English lecture is one of the most sought-after events of the year at the Faculty of Law. In 1984, Jacques-Yvan Morin gave a presentation there, as did the Honourable Justice Beverly McLachlin in 1991.

The McGill Law Journal’s Annual French Conference 
The francophone conference uses the same general concept as its English equivalent, that is, the McGill Law Journal invites a renowned speaker to present on a contested or little-known legal topic to the McGill and broader Montreal legal community. The following chart presents some of the speakers who have been invited to the francophone conference over the years as well as the topics covered in the presentations.

Past Editors, Members, and Authors

Editors in Chief 
Here is a list of the editors in chief of the McGill Law Journal from Volumes 1 through 67:

 Vol 67: Arthur Scalabrini
Vol 66: Nathaniel Reilly
 Vol 65: Lauren Weaver
 Vol 64: Joseph Spadafore
 Vol 63: Éléna Sophie Drouin
 Vol 62: Laura Cárdenas
 Vol 61: Fraser Harland
 Vol 60: William Stephenson
 Vol 59: Olga Redko
 Vol 58: Marie-Eve Goulet
 Vol 57: Will Colish
 Vol 56: Sara Ross
 Vol 55: Seo Yun Yang
 Vol 54: Erin Morgan
 Vol 53: Benjamin Moss
 Vol 52: David Sandomierski
 Vol 51: Kristin Ali
 Vol 50: Fabien Fourmanoit
 Vol 49: Toby Moneit
 Vol 48: Carole Chan
 Vol 47: Kevin MacLeod
 Vol 46: Robert Leckey
 Vol 45: Azim Hussain
 Vol 44: Karlo Giannascoli
 Vol 43: Sébastien Beaulieu
 Vol 42: Martin J. Valasek
 Vol 41: Mary-Pat Cormier
 Vol 40: Jodi Lackman
 Vol 39: Erica Stone
 Vol 38: Mark Phillips
 Vol 37: David A. Chemla
 Vol 36: Julia E. Hanigsberg
 Vol 35: Daniel Torsher
 Vol 34: Gary F. Bell
 Vol 33: M. Kevin Woodall
 Vol 32: Marc Lemieux
 Vol 31: Henry K. Schultz
 Vol 30: Peter Oliver
 Vol 29: Daniel Gogek
 Vol 28: Stephen Toope
 Vol 27: F. Jasper Meyers
 Vol 26: Linda R. Ganong (1979–1980) and Patrick Healy (1980–1981)
 Vol 25: Mona R. Paul
 Vol 24: Neil J. Smitheman
 Vol 23: Cally Jordan
 Vol 22: Louise Pelly
 Vol 21: Laura Falk Scott
 Vol 20: Frank H. Buckley
 Vol 19: Graham Nevin
 Vol 18: Michael David Kaylor
 Vol 17: Joel King
 Vol 16: André T. Mécs
 Vol 15: Leonard Serafini
 Vol 14: Ronald I. Cohen
 Vol 13: Douglas Pascal
 Vol 12: Stephen Allan Scott
 Vol 11: Larry S. Sazant
 Vol 10: Joseph J. Oliver 
 Vol 9: Mark M. Rosenstein
 Vol 8: Alan Z. Golden
 Vol 7: Norman M. May
 Vol 6: A. Derek Guthrie
 Vol 5: Henri P. Lafleur
 Vol 4: Raymond Barakett
 Vol 3: Harold W. Ashenmil
 Vol 2: John E. Lawrence
 Vol 1: Jacques-Yvan Morin (issue one), Fred Kaufman (issues two and three), and William H. Reynolds (issue four)

Some Former McGill Law Journal Editors 
Former McGill Law Journal editors include judges Benjamin J. Greenberg, Morris Fish, John Gomery, Jean-Louis Baudouin, Brian Riordan, Allan Lutfy, Suzanne Coupal, Brigitte Gouin, Ronna Brott, Nicholas Kasirer, and Max M. Teitelbaum; there have been some board chairs such as David P. O’Brien and Bernard Amyot; academics such as Dick Pound and Bartha Knoppers; entertainment professionals such as Lionel Chetwynd; and politicians such as Irwin Cotler, Yoine Goldstein, and Canada's Minister of Justice David Lametti.

Public Figures who have Published in the Journal 
Renowned public figures who have appeared in the pages of the Journal include former Canadian Prime Minister Pierre Elliot Trudeau, Supreme Court Justices Rosalie Abella and Gerald Fauteux, former Canadian Governor General David Johnston, and United Nations diplomat Yves Fortier.

External Publications

Books 
In 2013, author James Cummins published The Journal: 60 years of People, Prose, and Publication with 8th House Publishing in Montreal. In celebration of the Faculty of Law's sixtieth anniversary, the book recounts the history of the McGill Law Journal from the first volume to the fifty-seventh.

The Journal also featured in the book A Noble Roster: One Hundred and Fifty Years of Law at McGill, written by a former McGill Law student, Ian C. Pilarczyk.

Supreme Court of Canada References to Journal Articles 
The McGill Law Journal was the first Canadian legal publication to be cited in a Supreme Court decision. To date, the Journal has been cited by the Supreme Court of Canada in over 150 cases.

See also
 McGill Journal of Sustainable Development Law
 Canadian Guide to Uniform Legal Citation

References 

Canadian law journals
McGill University
Multilingual journals
1952 establishments in Quebec
Quarterly journals
Publications established in 1952
Law journals edited by students